Wiyao Ali Pidalnam Sanda-Nabede (born March 9, 1986 in Lomé) is a Togolese footballer, who plays for AC Merlan.

Career
Sanda-Nabede began his career in the youth from AC Merlan and joined than in summer 2001 for one year to Lycée de Dottignies in Belgium who with the school team, before in Winter 2003 promoted to the first team from AC Merlan.

International career
He was member of the Togo national football team his last call-up was on 25 February 2007.

Honours
 1994/1996 : Champion in Togo with the U-12 of AC Merlan
 1998/2000 : Finalist at International Championship in Burkina Faso
 2000/2001 : Champion du Togo « Juniors »
 2001/2002 : Togo national football team « Junior »
 2002      : Champion of the 2 division with AC Merlan
 June 2004 : Call-Up for the Togo national football team

References

External links
Official Site at SkyRock
Image

1986 births
Living people
Togolese footballers
Togo international footballers
Expatriate footballers in Belgium
Association football fullbacks
AC Merlan players
21st-century Togolese people